Hatch Lane & Highams Park North Ward is a political division of the London Borough of Waltham Forest, and is one of the six Waltham Forest wards of the Chingford and Woodford Green Constituency represented by Iain Duncan Smith MP.

The ward is represented at the council by three councillors with elections every four years. The councillors elected in the 2018 election were:
 Marion Fitzgerald (Conservative)
 Tim James (Conservative)
 Geoff Walker (Conservative)

Geoff Walker died on 21 March 2020. A by-election is due to take place on 6 May 2021.

The population of the ward of the ward at the 2011 Census was 11,058.

The ward boundaries were amended slightly to include a small part of the former Highams Park and Hale End Ward. The 2022 local elections were the first to use the new clunky name Hatch Lane and Highams Park North.

References

External links
 Councillor Laurie Braham
 Councillor Marion Fitzgerald
 Councillor Geoff Walker
 The Conservative Party
 The London Borough of Waltham Forest

Wards of the London Borough of Waltham Forest